Factory 2-U is a chain of stores founded in 1962, operated by National Stores. The brand under National Stores sells off-brand apparel under the Factory 2-U name.  Factory 2-U also operates stores under the name Fallas Paredes.

The chain was formerly operated by Factory 2-U Stores, Inc.  which was headquartered in San Diego, California.  The company was known for selling excess apparel and closeout merchandise from brands such as Converse, Gap, Levi's, and Polo Sport.

In 2003 the company Factory 2-U Stores operated locations in Alabama, Arizona (where it already had locations), Arkansas, California, Louisiana, Mississippi, Missouri, Nevada, New Mexico, Oklahoma, Oregon, Tennessee, Texas, and Washington. When Factory 2-U Stores filed for bankruptcy protection in February 2004, it arranged the sale of 172 stores to National Stores.  In August 2004, Factory 2-U stores liquidated, receiving $28.5 million from the sale to Factory 2-U Liquidation LLC, a consortium headed by National Stores.

References

External links 

 Official National Stores website
 Factory 2-U (Archive)

Discount stores of the United States
American companies established in 1962
Retail companies established in 1962
Companies based in San Diego
1962 establishments in California
Companies that filed for Chapter 11 bankruptcy in 2004
Companies that filed for Chapter 11 bankruptcy in 2018